Pseudeutreta is a genus of tephritid  or fruit flies in the family Tephritidae.

Species
Pseudeutreta adspersa (Wiedemann, 1830)
Pseudeutreta anteapicalis Hendel, 1914
Pseudeutreta baccharidis (Kieffer & Jörgensen, 1910)
Pseudeutreta falcigera (Kieffer & Jörgensen, 1910)
Pseudeutreta ilonae (Aczél, 1953)
Pseudeutreta ligularis Bates, 1933
Pseudeutreta lunulata (Macquart, 1851)
Pseudeutreta nobilis (Aczél, 1953)
Pseudeutreta orfilai (Aczél, 1953)
Pseudeutreta paragranum Hering, 1942
Pseudeutreta quadrigutta (Walker, 1853)

References

Tephritinae
Tephritidae genera
Diptera of South America